Viktor Erik Kjäll ( anglicized as Kjell; born 13 June 1985) is a Swedish curler originally from Karlstad.

Curling career 
Viktor Kjäll made his World Championship debut at the 2007 Edmonton World Championships as the Second for Sweden's most successful male skip at that time, Peja Lindholm. They finished with a 6 – 5 record in a four-way tie for fourth place. In the tie-breaking rounds, they lost to the eventual Silver Medalists Team Germany skipped by Andy Kapp.

After Peja Lindholm's retirement, Kjäll eventually made his way onto Niklas Edin's team. Their first major competition was the 2009 European Championships held in Aberdeen, Scotland. They lost just two matches in the round robin and went on to win both of their playoff matches against Team Ulsrud of Norway and Team Stöckli of Switzerland to win the Gold Medal.

Kjäll's team had been selected as Team Sweden for the 2010 Winter Olympics in Vancouver, British Columbia, Canada  and most recently for Team Sweden for the 2014 Winter Olympics in Sochi, Russia where they captured a bronze medal.

After a successful career on the ice, Kjäll began coaching. He coached the Kyle Smith Scottish team from 2015 to 2018. Between 2018 and 2022 Kjäll, was the team coach for Team Jennifer Jones, and coached them when they represented Canada at the 2022 Winter Olympics in Beijing. 

In 2011, he was inducted into the Swedish Curling Hall of Fame.

Personal life
After his curling career in Sweden, he moved to Whitby, Ontario.  He is married and has one daughter and works as the curling manager at The Granite Club in Toronto. In September 2022 it was announced that Kjäll was appointed the new national coach for the Swiss Curling Association.

Teammates
2009 Aberdeen European Championships

2010 Vancouver Olympic Games

 Niklas Edin, Skip
 Sebastian Kraupp, Third
 Fredrik Lindberg, Second
 Oskar Eriksson, Alternate

2007 Edmonton World Championships

Peja Lindholm, Skip
James Dryburgh, Third
Anders Eriksson, Lead
Magnus Swartling, Alternate

References

External links
 
 

1985 births
Living people
Swedish male curlers
Curlers at the 2010 Winter Olympics
Curlers at the 2014 Winter Olympics
Olympic bronze medalists for Sweden
Olympic curlers of Sweden
Sportspeople from Karlstad
World curling champions
European curling champions
Swedish curling champions
Medalists at the 2014 Winter Olympics
Olympic medalists in curling
Medalists at the 2007 Winter Universiade
Universiade medalists in curling
Sportspeople from Whitby, Ontario
Swedish expatriate sportspeople in Canada
Swedish curling coaches
Universiade gold medalists for Sweden
Universiade bronze medalists for Sweden
Competitors at the 2007 Winter Universiade
Competitors at the 2009 Winter Universiade
21st-century Swedish people